Sideshow is a horror film from 2000 and released Full Moon Pictures directed by Emmy award winner Fred Olen Ray.

Plot 
High school students visit a traveling carnival home to "unique" exhibits. They meet with a fortune teller who lets them in on what the future holds. One by one the teens get their desires but at a cost. Soon it becomes a battle for survival in hopes to not become a part of the show themselves.

Cast 
Jamie Martz as Bobby

Michael Amos as Tommy

Scott McCann as Grant (credited as Scott Clark)

Jessi Keenan as Melanie

Phil Fondacaro as Abbot Graves

Jeana Blackman as Jeanie

Peter Spellos as Conjoin-O/Lester

Luigi Francis Shorty Rossi as Little Face

Curran Sympson as Aelita

Fred Pierce as Hans/Bug Boy

Shyra Deland as Digestina

Ross Hagen as Sheriff

Brinke Stevens as Madam Volosca

Alicia McCutcheon as Hilda The Faceless Girl

Richard Gabai as Agent

Filming Locations  
Corriganville Movie Ranch, California

Simi Valley, California

Reception 
The movie has mixed reviews. Getting higher marks from those who are fans of Full Moon Pictures.

Jason at triskaidekafiles said, "Like a lot of Full Moon pictures, this movie is surprisingly good despite its cheese.  It has a story, it knows how to tell it, and the plot holes aren't overwhelming.  They do cheese right.  But it IS cheesy.  Three out of five digested toasters."

Allmovie rated Sideshow 2 out of 5.

References

External links 

 
 

Films directed by Fred Olen Ray
2000s English-language films